Sharon Manning (born March 20, 1969) is a former professional basketball player. She played nationally (WNBA) and overseas.

College
Manning attended North Carolina State University. She was the 1991 ACC Women's Basketball Tournament MVP, leading NC State to the title. In 2014, she was named to the Atlantic Coast Conference's 10th annual class of Women's Basketball Legends.

NC State statistics
Source

WNBA
Manning played for the Charlotte Sting and Miami Sol.

WNBA per game stats

Regular season

|-
| style="text-align:left;"|1997
| style="text-align:left;"|Charlotte
| 28 || 5 || 15.6 || .464 || — || .420 || 3.5 || 0.5 || 0.9 || 0.2 || 1.0 || 4.9
|-
| style="text-align:left;"|1998
| style="text-align:left;"|Charlotte
| 30 || 6 || 19.2 || .440 || .000 || .667 || 5.5 || 1.0 || 1.1 || 0.2 || 1.4 || 5.4
|-
| style="text-align:left;"|1999
| style="text-align:left;"|Charlotte
| 32 || 6 || 16.3 || .504 || 1.000 || .522 || 3.6 || 0.5 || 0.9 || 0.1 || 0.8 || 4.3
|-
| style="text-align:left;"|2000
| style="text-align:left;"|Miami
| 24 || 9 || 16.8 || .478 || .500 || .538 || 4.2 || 0.7 || 1.0 || 0.2 || 1.6 || 4.3
|-
| style="text-align:left;"|Career
| style="text-align:left;"|4 years, 2 teams
| 114 || 26 || 17.0 || .470 || .400 || .548 || 4.2 || 0.7 || 0.9 || 0.2 || 1.2 || 4.7

Playoffs

|-
| style="text-align:left;"|1997
| style="text-align:left;"|Charlotte
| 1 || 0 || 4.0 || .500 || — || — || 0.0 || 0.0 || 1.0 || 0.0 || 0.0 || 2.0
|-
| style="text-align:left;"|1998
| style="text-align:left;"|Charlotte
| 2 || 0 || 11.0 || .250 || — || — || 2.0 || 0.0 || 0.5 || 0.0 || 1.5 || 1.0
|-
| style="text-align:left;"|1999
| style="text-align:left;"|Charlotte
| 4 || 0 || 14.8 || .308 || — || .750 || 2.3 || 0.5 || 0.3 || 0.0 || 0.0 || 2.8
|-
| style="text-align:left;"|Career
| style="text-align:left;"|3 years, 1 team
| 7 || 0 || 12.1 || .316 || — || .750 || 1.9 || 0.3 || 0.4 || 0.0 || 0.4 || 2.1

Personal life
Manning graduated NC State with a degree in sociology.

References

External links

1969 births
Living people
Basketball players from Virginia
Charlotte Sting players
Miami Sol players
NC State Wolfpack women's basketball players
People from Emporia, Virginia
Centers (basketball)
Forwards (basketball)